The men's 3000 metres steeplechase event at the 1995 Summer Universiade was held on 2 September at the Hakatanomori Athletic Stadium in Fukuoka, Japan.

Results

References

Athletics at the 1995 Summer Universiade
1995